The year 2011 is the 10th year in the history of Cage Warriors, a mixed martial arts promotion based in the United Kingdom. In 2011 Cage Rage Championships held 7 events beginning with, Cage Warriors: 40.

Events list

Cage Warriors: 40

Cage Warriors: 40 was an event held on February 26, 2011 in London, England.

Results

Cage Warriors: 41

Cage Warriors: 41 was an event held on April 24, 2011 in London, England.

Results

Cage Warriors: 42

Cage Warriors: 42 was an event held on May 28, 2011 in Cork, Ireland.

Results

Cage Warriors: Fight Night 1

Cage Warriors: Fight Night 1 was an event held on June 16, 2011 in Amman, Jordan.

Results

Cage Warriors: 43

Cage Warriors: 43 was an event held on July 9, 2011 in London, England.

Results

Cage Warriors: Fight Night 2

Cage Warriors: Fight Night 2 was an event held on September 8, 2011 in Amman, Jordan.

Results

Cage Warriors: 44

Cage Warriors: 44 was an event held on October 1, 2011 in London, England.

Results

See also 
 Cage Warriors

References

Cage Warriors events
2011 in mixed martial arts